The Memphis Redbirds Minor League Baseball team has played in Memphis, Tennessee, for 24 years since its establishment in 1998. As of the completion of the 2022 season, the club has played in 3,410 regular season games and compiled a win–loss record of 1,713–1,697. Combining all 3,468 regular season and postseason games, the Redbirds have an all-time record of 1,747–1,721.

The Redbirds were created as an expansion team of the Triple-A Pacific Coast League (PCL) in 1998. As the Triple-A affiliate of the St. Louis Cardinals, their only major league parent club, Memphis incurred second and third-place finishes in their first two years of competition. The Redbirds won their first PCL championship in 2000. Over the next eight seasons, the club regularly placed third or fourth (last) in their division. They won a second league championship in 2009 and vied for a third in 2010 but were defeated in the finals. Memphis qualified for the postseason just once from 2011 to 2016 before winning back-to-back PCL championships in 2017 and 2018. The 2018 Redbirds also won the Triple-A National Championship. All told, Memphis won six division titles, five conference titles, four league championships, and one Triple-A championship in 23 years of membership in the PCL. In conjunction with Major League Baseball's restructuring of Minor League Baseball in 2021, the Redbirds were placed in the new Triple-A East, which became the International League in 2022.
  
Memphis' best season record occurred in 2017, when they finished 91–50 (.645). Their lowest record was 57–87 (.369) in 2012.

Table key

Season-by-season records

Notes

References
Specific

General

Seasons